Osterfeld is a town in the Burgenlandkreis district, in Saxony-Anhalt, Germany. It is situated southeast of Naumburg. It is part of the Verbandsgemeinde ("collective municipality") Wethautal. On 1 January 2010 it absorbed the former municipalities Goldschau, Heidegrund and Waldau.

Notable people
Günther Prien (1908-1941), World War II U-boat commander

References

Towns in Saxony-Anhalt
Burgenlandkreis